The 100th Regiment Illinois Volunteer Infantry was an infantry regiment that served in the Union Army during the American Civil War.

Service 
The 100th Illinois Infantry was organized at Joliet, Illinois, and mustered into Federal service on August 30, 1862. The regiment was mustered out on June 12, 1865, and discharged at Chicago, Illinois, on June 15, 1865.

Total strength and casualties 
The regiment suffered 7 officers and 73 enlisted men who were killed in action or who died of their wounds and 134 enlisted men who died of disease, for a total of 214 fatalities.

Commanders 
 Colonel Frederick A. Bartleson - killed in action at the Battle of Kennesaw Mountain on June 23, 1864.
 Lieutenant Colonel Charles M. Hammond - Mustered out with the regiment.

See also 
 List of Illinois Civil War Units
 Illinois in the American Civil War

References

External links 
 The Civil War Archive

Units and formations of the Union Army from Illinois
Military units and formations established in 1862
Military units and formations disestablished in 1865
1862 establishments in Illinois